(born Higashiōsaka, Osaka. August 27, 1971) is a former Japanese rugby union footballer. He played as a centre and was known for his powerful running and tackling.

He played for Meiji University and for Kobelco Steelers in the Japanese Top League.

Motoki had 79 caps representing Japan, scoring 9 tries, 45 points in aggregate, from 1991 to 2005. He was selected for four Rugby World Cup finals, in 1991, without playing, in 1995, playing in three matches, 1999, again in three matches, and 2003. He never scored in any of his World Cup presences.

References

External links
Yukio Motoki International Statistics

Japanese rugby union players
Kobelco Kobe Steelers players
People from Higashiōsaka
1971 births
Living people
Japan international rugby union players
Asian Games medalists in rugby union
Rugby union players at the 1998 Asian Games
Rugby union players at the 2002 Asian Games
Asian Games silver medalists for Japan
Medalists at the 1998 Asian Games
Medalists at the 2002 Asian Games
Japan international rugby sevens players